WUCZ (104.1 FM, "104.1 The Ranch") is a radio station broadcasting a new country music format. Licensed to Carthage, Tennessee, United States, the station is currently owned by Wood Broadcasting, Inc. and features programming from Dial Global.

References

External links
 
 

Country radio stations in the United States
UCZ
Smith County, Tennessee